Casey County is a county located in the U.S. Commonwealth of Kentucky. As of the 2020 census, the population was 15,941.  Its county seat is Liberty. The county was formed in 1806 from the western part of Lincoln County and named for Colonel William Casey, a pioneer settler who moved his family to Kentucky in 1779. It is the only Kentucky county entirely in the Knobs region. Casey County is home to annual Casey County Apple Festival, and is a prohibition or dry county. It is considered part of the Appalachian region of Kentucky.

History
Casey County was established in 1806 from land given by Lincoln County. The third and present courthouse was built in 1889.

In 2015, County Clerk Casey Davis received national press when he announced he would deny same-sex marriage licenses, as a show of solidarity with fellow county clerk Kim Davis, who was criticized and later jailed for doing the same thing in Rowan County, Kentucky.

Geography

Adjacent counties
 Boyle County  (north)
 Lincoln County  (east)
 Pulaski County  (southeast)
 Russell County  (south/CST Border)
 Adair County  (southwest/CST Border)
 Taylor County  (west)
 Marion County  (northwest)

Major highways

Demographics

As of the census of 2000, there were 15,447 people, 6,260 households, and 4,419 families residing in the county. The racial makeup of the county was 98.30% White, 0.33% Black or African American, 0.28% Native American, 0.06% Asian, 0.05% Pacific Islander, 0.31% from other races, and 0.66% from two or more races.  1.28% of the population were Hispanic or Latino of any race.

There were 6,260 households, out of which 31.00% had children under the age of 18 living with them, 56.10% were married couples living together, 10.80% had a female householder with no husband present, and 29.40% were non-families. 26.80% of all households were made up of individuals, and 12.60% had someone living alone who was 65 years of age or older.  The average household size was 2.44 and the average family size was 2.94.

24.50% of the population was under the age of 18, 8.20% from 18 to 24, 27.50% from 25 to 44, 24.70% from 45 to 64, and 15.10% who were 65 years of age or older.  The median age was 38 years. For every 100 females there were 95.60 males.  For every 100 females age 18 and over, there were 92.60 males.

The median income for a household in the county was $21,580, and the median income for a family was $27,044. Males had a median income of $22,283 versus $17,885 for females. The per capita income for the county was $12,867.  About 20.70% of families and 25.50% of the population were below the poverty line, including 32.10% of those under age 18 and 29.60% of those age 65 or over.

Politics
Casey County has one of the longest streaks of voting for Republican Party candidates in presidential elections in Kentucky & nationwide, with its candidates gaining the majority of the vote by wide margins in every election from 1916 on. No Democratic presidential candidate has even managed to gain 30% of the county's vote since Jimmy Carter in 1976.

Education
Casey County Schools operates public schools.

Communities
 Bethelridge
 Clementsville
 Creston
 Dunnville
 Liberty (county seat)
 Middleburg
 Phil
 Jacktown
 Penetralia
 Teddy
 Upper Tygart
 Walltown
 Windsor
 Yosemite

Notable people
 Silas Adams, member of the United States House of Representatives (1893-1895)
 Tim Butler, The Psychedelic Furs bass player
 Charles T. Wethington Jr., former president of the University of Kentucky
 Crystal Wilkinson, author
 Wallace G. Wilkinson, governor of Kentucky (1987-1991)

See also

 Dry counties
 National Register of Historic Places listings in Casey County, Kentucky

References

External links
 The Kentucky Highlands Project

 
1806 establishments in Kentucky
Populated places established in 1806
Kentucky counties
Counties of Appalachia